The 1898 SAFA Grand Final was the concluding championship match of the 1898 SAFA season. The game resulted in a victory for  who beat  by 24 points.

References 

SANFL Grand Finals
SAFA Grand Final, 1898
SAFA Grand Final